Feofan or Theophan is a male given name. It may refer to:
Theofan (Bystrov) (1875–1940), Russian archbishop
Feofan Davitaia (1911–1979), Georgian geographer
Theophanes the Greek (c. 1340 – c. 1410), Byzantine Greek artist
Theophan Prokopovich, (1681–1736), Russian theologian